The 1889 All-Ireland Senior Hurling Championship was the third staging of the All-Ireland hurling championship since its establishment by the Gaelic Athletic Association in 1887. The championship began on 27 July 1889 and ended on 3 November 1889.

Tipperary were the defending champions; however, they were defeated in the provincial series. Dublin won the title following a 5-1 to 1-6 defeat of Clare in the final.

Teams

A total of ten teams contested the championship, one less than the previous year.  It was the first championship to be completed since 1887.

The Leinster championship was contested by just four teams; however, due to walkovers and disputes, only one game was played. 1888 championship participants Kildare did not field a team.

All six counties entered a team in the Munster championship.

Once again, the hurling championship was not contested in either Connacht or Ulster.

Team summaries

Results

Leinster Senior Hurling Championship

Munster Senior Hurling Championship

All-Ireland Senior Hurling Championship

Championship statistics
 Kilkenny had originally intended field a team in the championship; however, they withdrew as they did not recognise the newly formed Central Council.
 In the Munster semi-final, Tipperary defeated Clare by 3-0 to 2-2. A subsequent objection by Clare saw the result overturned.
 W.J. Spain of Dublin becomes the first dual All-Ireland medallist.  He had previously won an All-Ireland medal with the Limerick Gaelic footballers in 1887

Notes

Sources
 Corry, Eoghan, The GAA Book of Lists (Hodder Headline Ireland, 2005).
 Donegan, Des, The Complete Handbook of Gaelic Games (DBA Publications Limited, 2005).

External links
 1889 All-Ireland Senior Hurling Championship results

1889
All-Ireland Senior Hurling Championships